Corethamnium is a genus of flowering plants in the family Asteraceae.

There is only one known species, Corethamnium chocoensis, endemic to the Chocó region of northwestern Colombia.

References

Endemic flora of Colombia
Eupatorieae
Monotypic Asteraceae genera